Calothamnus quadrifidus subsp. homalophyllus is a plant in the myrtle family, Myrtaceae and is endemic to the south-west of Western Australia.  It is similar to other subspecies of Calothamnus quadrifidus except that its leaves are longer and wider.

Description

The flowers are red and arranged in clusters, usually on one side of the stem amongst the older leaves.

Taxonomy and naming
Calothamnus quadrifidus subsp. homalophyllus was first formally described in 2010 by Alex George in Nuytsia. It had originally been described in 1849 by Ferdinand von Mueller as Calothamnus homalophyllus from a specimen collected near Red Bluff on the Murchison River.

Distribution and habitat
Calothamnus quadrifidus subsp. homalophyllus is found between Mingenew, the lower Murchison River and Eurardy Reserve in the Geraldton Sandplains, Jarrah Forest and Swan Coastal Plain biogeographic regions.

Conservation
Calothamnus quadrifidus subsp. homalophyllus is classified as "not threatened" by the Western Australian Government Department of Parks and Wildlife.

References

quadrifidus
Myrtales of Australia
Plants described in 2010
Plant subspecies